A Rendezvous in Averoigne is a collection of science fiction, fantasy and horror stories by American writer Clark Ashton Smith.  It was released in 1988  by Arkham House in an edition of 5,025 copies.  The collection contains stories from Smith's major story cycles of Averoigne, Hyperborea, Poseidonis, Xiccarph, and Zothique. Its title story is a relatively conventional vampire story.

Contents

A Rendezvous in Averoigne contains the following stories:

 "Introduction", by Ray Bradbury
 Averoigne
 "The Holiness of Azédarac"
 "The Colossus of Ylourgne"
 "The End of the Story"
 "A Rendezvous in Averoigne"
 Atlantis
 "The Last Incantation"
 "The Death of Malygris"
 "A Voyage to Sfanomoë"
 Hyperborea
 "The Weird of Avoosl Wuthoqquan"
 "The Seven Geases"
 "The Tale of Satampra Zeiros"
 "The Coming of the White Worm"
 Lost Worlds
 "The City of the Singing Flame"
 "The Dweller in the Gulf"
 "The Chain of Aforgomon"
 "Genius Loci"
 "The Maze of Maal Dweb"
 "The Vaults of Yoh-Vombis"
 "The Uncharted Isle"
 "The Planet of the Dead"
 "Master of the Asteroid"
 Zothique
 "The Empire of the Necromancers"
 "The Charnel God"
 "Xeethra"
 "The Dark Eidolon"
 "The Death of Ilalotha"
 "The Last Hieroglyph"
 "Necromancy in Naat"
 "The Garden of Adompha"
 "The Isle of the Torturers"
 "Morthylla"

Reprints
2nd printing, 2003  (no print numbers).

See also
 Clark Ashton Smith bibliography

Sources

1988 short story collections
Science fiction short story collections by Clark Ashton Smith
Fantasy short story collections
Horror short story collections
Arkham House books